EKWB (Edvard König Water Blocks), better known as EK Water Blocks, is a Slovenian company founded in 2003 that manufactures high-end computer water cooling, extreme cooling, and some air cooling components for CPUs, GPU, RAM and SSDs. Their target audience consists of custom PC building enthusiasts and professionals, and the company offers a complete range of water cooling products from radiators to tubing to water blocks. EKWB sells its products through a number of authorized distributors worldwide, but also maintains its own web store focused on direct to consumer sales. Its primary brand strategy makes use of influencer marketing to advertise products through sponsorships or review samples.

History 
EKWB was founded in 2003 by Edvard König, who wanted a better thermal and acoustic performance for his personal computer. The company released new versions of its products, resulting in a 40% cooling performance increase from 2006 to 2011. As of 2011 EKWB was one of the three largest personal computer water cooling companies. EKWB works with the overclocking community through forums to better understand the needs of its customers.

Products 
EKWB specialises in cooling supplies. Its product line includes: Quantum CPU water blocks, GPU water blocks, radiators, computer fans, AIO (All-in-one) liquid cooling sets and several accessories.

CPU Water Blocks 
Currently, EKWB sells a number of CPUs water cooling blocks, primarily EK-Annihilator designed for socket LGA 3647 and the Quantum line of CPU Blocks for a wide range of CPU sockets.

The EK-Supremacy EVO, EK-Supremacy MX and EK-Velocity have mounting kits available for Intel's Socket T, B, H, H2, H3, H4, R, R3 and R4. (N.B. Socket R2 is also compatible but was only used for certain server processors) and AMD's Socket 754, 939, 940, AM2(+), AM3(+), AM4, FM1 and FM2(+). The EK-Annihilator is required for Intels server LGA 3647 and the EK-Supremacy sTR is required for AMD's EPYC and Threadripper CPU's mounting holes, respectfully.

EKWB also sells a range of Monoblocks, CPU blocks that are much larger and also cool the motherboard's VRM to ensure that it does not overheat from high load. These monoblocks are based on the EK-Supremacy EVO.

EKWB often works in collaboration with computer hardware brands such as Asus, MSI and Gigabyte to bring custom Monoblocks to their high-end gaming motherboards and GPUs. Those custom-built blocks will usually have cooling for the CPU, VRMs, M.2 slot and chipset/southbridge. Those blocks are sold as part of their respective motherboards or GPUs, rather than as a separate aftermarket part by EKWB.

Blocks are offered in a number of finishes, with interchange top parts. Blocks are made from copper (or in the Fluid Gaming case aluminium) and either left as bare copper, nickel plated or gold-plated. The block's top, as they call it, are made from either nickel plated brass, Acetal (usually black, though white is an option) or plexi tops (both clear and colour tinted).

In the late 2021, EKWB has announced the launch of a new AMD AM4 socket-based monoblock belonging to the Quantum Line of products, the EK-Quantum Momentum² ROG Strix X570-I Gaming D-RGB. This monoblock is engineered specifically for the ROG Strix X570-I Gaming ITX motherboard from ASUS. The addressable D-RGB LED in the monoblock is compatible with ASUS Aura Sync RGB control and offers a full lighting customization experience for every single diode at any given time. This monoblock is EK-Matrix7 compatible.

GPU Water Blocks 
EKWB produces both universal GPU water blocks, that only cool the GPU's silicon die, as well as full-cover water blocks that cool the die, VRAM and VRMs. EKWB makes a number of versions for so called AIB partner cards such as Sapphire, ASUS and EVGA, custom PCB versions of the standard video card, which have different PCB layouts. Full cover blocks are not compatible with different versions, even with the same GPU core, e.g. a block for a Nvidia GeForce GTX 1080 Founders Edition will not work with an ASUS ROG Strix version of the GeForce GTX 1080.

EKWB Universal GPU blocks are marketed as EK-VGA Supremacy for single graphics card setup, and a larger version called EK-Thermosphere is designed for use with more than one graphics card. These blocks only cool the GPU core, and usually leave the VRAM and VRMs on a card to be cooled by air. Should a user fail to ensure these vital parts of the card are also cooled, either by placing a fan to direct air over them, or by the use of stick-on heat sinks, it's possible for the card to shut down, or die even, from overheating.

Just like the CPU blocks, the company offers the blocks in different style offerings in both bare copper and nickel plating, and cover plates made from Acetal or Plexi. EK-VGA Supremacy can also be found with a nickel plated brass top option.

RAM Water Blocks 
EKWB offers a range of blocks for RAM DIMM modules, marketed as EK-RAM Monarch. Due to the tight spaces involved in RAM DIMM layouts on modern PCs, the water blocks do not sit directly on the RAM modules, but rather connect to special heat spreaders attached to the DIMM's, they then screw into the RAM block which sits on top and is thermally connected via TIM. They sell these blocks in two and four DIMM versions. They are available as both bare copper and nickel plated copper, as well as in acetal and plexi versions. The heat spreaders are offered in aluminium with black or nickel finishes. Copper versions are also available for the extreme cooling version.

PC Case Fans 
EKWB has its own range of fans especially designed for use with PC water cooling radiators. These fans produce high static pressure with low noise, providing increased efficiency in the movement of air through a radiator when compared to an ordinary case fan. These fans are available in a number of colour combinations, rotational speeds, and in sizes of 120 mm and 140 mm, the two main PC cooling standards for enthusiasts.

PC Water Cooling Radiators 
EKWB offer radiators in a number of sizes and thicknesses, marketed as CoolStream. Its 120 mm radiator options as single (120 mm x 120 mm), dual (240 mm x 120 mm), triple (360 mm x 120 mm) and quad (480 mm x 120 mm) fan places in thicknesses of 28 mm (SE line) 38 mm (PE line) and 60 mm (XE line). For 140 mm radiator options, there are single (140 mm x 140 mm), dual (280 mm x 140 mm), triple (420 mm x 140 mm) and quad (560 mm x 140 mm) fan places in thicknesses of 28 mm (SE Line) and 45 mm (CE line). Recently, following the revival of 180 mm fans, the company also started offering 180 mm size rads, in single (180 mm x 180 mm), dual (360 mm x 180 mm) and triple (540 mm x 180 mm) in a thickness of 35 mm (WE line).

The radiators are made with copper tubes, brass end tanks soldered to the tubes and copper fins in an aluminium housing.

References 

Manufacturing companies of Slovenia
Computer hardware cooling
Computer hardware companies